Around the House is a 1998 studio album by British electronic musician Herbert. It is an electroacoustic album using "samples of washing machines, toasters and toothbrushes, processed into swinging grooves".

Critical reception

John Bush of AllMusic deemed Around the House "much more suited to straight-ahead dance music than Herbert's previous work" and stated that Herbert "proves quite adept" at creating backing music for the album's featured vocalist Dani Siciliano. Pitchfork reviewer Mark Richardson described Around the House as "a bit more focused on sound than song" compared to its 2001 follow-up Bodily Functions; while finding Bodily Functions a stronger album, he admitted that "this could well be a matter of which record I heard first" and concluded, "Both albums are loaded with music of exceptionally high quality."

Around the House was named the 96th greatest album of the 1990s by Pitchfork.

Track listing

Personnel
Credits adapted from liner notes.
 Matthew Herbert – production, piano, Rhodes piano, guitar, bass guitar, violin, backing vocals
 Dani Siciliano – vocals
 R. Vine – guitar, bass guitar

References

External links
 

1998 albums
Matthew Herbert albums
Electroacoustic music albums